Dove Press may refer to 
 Dove Medical Press An academic publisher of open access, peer-reviewed, scientific and medical journals
 Doves Press A private press, based in Hammersmith, London, England (19001916)